The 2015 season for Team Sky began in January at the Tour Down Under.

As a UCI WorldTeam, they were automatically invited and obliged to send a squad to every event in the UCI World Tour.

Team roster

Riders who joined the team for the 2015 season

Riders who left the team during or after the 2014 season

Season overview

On 8 January, Richie Porte scored the team's first victory of the season by winning the Australian National Time Trial championships with a margin of eight seconds  and went on to record the team's first stage win at the Tour Down Under. Elia Viviani scored his first win for the team, taking sprint victory on stage two of the Dubai Tour.

In August, the team signed Alex Peters and Tao Geoghegan Hart for the remainder of the season, with the former also signing for two years.

Grand Tours

Giro d'Italia
The team entered the 2015 Giro d'Italia with Porte installed as team leader in the hope that he would continue his good run in stage races and claim the Maglia Rosa. In order to do this and in the team's quest for 'marginal gains' Porte slept in a motorhome which followed the race, rather than hotels like the rest of the team. After limiting the time loss in the stage 1 team time trial Elia Viviani secured the first win for the team in a Grand Tour since the 2013 Vuelta a España on stage 2, also taking over the Maglia rossa. After enjoying a successful first week Porte entered the second week of racing in third position overall, however on stage 10 an untimely puncture (outside of the 3 km ruling) caused him to lose 47 seconds to overall race leader, Alberto Contador. Porte and Clarke were subsequently docked two minutes each and faced a 200 Swiss Franc fine. This resulted in Porte dropping down to 12th on the general classification, three minutes and nine seconds behind Contador. The implementation of the penalty caused outcry on social media; David Millar praised the sportsmanship shown between the two riders as well as Jonathan Vaughters, Chris Horner, Chris Boardman and Tom Domoulin. Team Principal, Dave Brailsford criticised the decision, saying that the "spirit of the law" had not been recognised and that there was a lack of common sense. Giro d'Italia race director Mauro Vegni claimed the rule had to be enforced whilst UCI President Brian Cookson agreed that it was the correct decision. Porte then lost further time on the uphill finish at Monte Berico on stage 12 and a further two minutes on stage 13 after being caught behind a crash, leaving him in 17th spot, five minutes and five seconds behind new overall leader, Fabio Aru. Stage 14 saw the riders tackle the 59.4 km time trial from Treviso to Valdobbiadene, where Vasil Kiryienka claimed the stage win, whilst Porte  conceded a further four minutes and six seconds to Contador, leaving him in 17th position, eight minutes and 52 seconds behind the race leader. On the next stage Porte lost a further 27 minutes and abandoned on the second rest day, team leadership being handed over to Leopold König. König would finish the Giro in sixth position, over ten minutes behind victor, Alberto Contador.

Tour de France

The team went into the 2015 Tour de France with their "strongest team ever" seeking to improve on their poor 2014 edition of the race. The team entered with Froome leading the title challenge, along with Poels, König, Kennaugh, Porte and Roche for the hillier stages as well as Stannard, Rowe and Thomas for the flatter days, in particular stage 4 from Seraing to Cambrai which featured no less than seven cobbled sectors. After a strong performance on the Mur de Huy Froome took over the race lead, and general classification by one second over Tony Martin. The previous time he had held the yellow jersey he won the race. Froome refused to wear the yellow jersey after Tony Martin abandoned the race due to a broken collar bone sustained on stage six. Froome then received the yellow jersey at the end of the seventh stage by virtue of being in second place overall. During the evening of the first rest day of the Tour, it emerged that some of Froome's data files had been hacked and released onto the internet. As the Tour entered the second week of racing stage 10 saw the first mountains stage, the summit finish of La Pierre-Saint-Martin, where Froome went  on to take the stage win, putting significant time into his general classification rivals as well as Porte finishing second and Thomas finishing sixth. During the remainder of the race the team faced intense scrutiny regarding their dominant performances; Porte was punched in the ribs by a spectator in the Pyrenees, and Froome claimed he had urine thrown at him by another spectator, and blamed the incident on the French press for 'irresponsible' reporting

On the first rest of the Tour de France Porte confirmed he would leave the team at the end of the season. This would later, in August, be confirmed to be .

La Vuelta a España
On 10 August, Chris Froome announced his intention to compete in this years Vuelta a España, becoming only the second reigning Tour winner to ride the Vuelta in the same season.

Stage races
In February the team dominated the Vuelta a Andalucía and Volta ao Algarve with both Froome and Thomas taking both overall wins respectively. On the way to their respective victories Froome won on the stage four summit finish at Alto de Allanadas, whilst both Thomas and Porte won in the Algarve, winning stage two and the stage four summit finish of Malhão. Further, the team also secured multiple top placings; fourth (Nieve), sixth (Kennaugh) and eighth (Siutsou) in Andalucía and fourth (Porte) in the Algarve. At the end of February Stannard scored the team second classic, taking a second successive victory at Omloop Het Nieuwsblad. The victory was made more impressive as Stannard made the four-man selection with three  riders; Boonen, Terpstra and Vandenbergh.

The team's next victory came at Paris–Nice where Porte led a team one-two (along with Thomas) at the summit finish of Croix de Chaubouret. Despite both Porte and Thomas crashing on the stage 6 descent of the Côte de Peille Porte went on to win the stage 7 time trial to the summit of Col d'Èze securing his second overall victory in the race, with a winning margin of 30 seconds over Michał Kwiatkowski.

In the same week, new recruit Wout Poels recorded his first victory for the team when he secured victory on the fifth stage of Tirreno–Adriatico to Castelraimondo. Poels made his decisive move just before the second summiting of the Cipressa, finishing 14 seconds clear of former Sky rider Rigoberto Urán, Joaquim Rodríguez and the rest of the leading group. As a result of his win, Poels moved into the overall race lead. Ben Swift won the second stage of Settimana Internazionale di Coppi e Bartali the same day and finally Richie Porte moved into the lead of the Volta a Catalunya a lead he would carry to the end of the race. Victory in Catalunya represented Porte's second overall win of the season and the fourth for the team.

In April, Bradley Wiggins won his final time trial for the team at the Three Days of De Panne, beating Stefan Küng by 10 seconds.

In late April Porte notched up his third overall win of the season, taking the Giro d'Italia warm-up Giro del Trentino four-day stage race. Porte took a decisive stage victory on the queen stage summit finish to Brentonico giving him a margin of 24 seconds over his closest rival, Mikel Landa. Porte would carry the majority of this gap to the finish in Cles. The team then rounded off a successful April by taking victory in the Team Time Trial, by the scant margin of 0.63 seconds, at the Tour de Romandie, placing Geraint Thomas in the yellow leaders jersey

The team rounded off April taking victory in the Tour de Romandie team time trial, Froome taking third place overall. The team began May with success; Lars Petter Nordhaug took the opening stage win at the inaugural Tour de Yorkshire, whilst Ben Swift crashed out later requiring surgery.

Chris Froome returned to action at the Critérium du Dauphiné, as part of his build up for the Tour de France, and the team won three stages and took the overall title for the fourth time. Peter Kennaugh opened the team's account taking the victory on stage one, just in front of the bunch sprint finish. Froome went on to dominate the final two summit finish stages, taking victory at Montée du Bettex (stage 7) and Modane Valfréjus (stage 8) giving him a lead of 10 seconds over Tejay van Garderen.

One day races

In late March the team enjoyed a bumper weekend starting with Geraint Thomas' victory in E3 Harelbeke after attacking his co-breakaway companions, Zdeněk Štybar and Peter Sagan, and soloing to victory.

The weekend was then finished off with Thomas once again, taking third place in Gent–Wevelgem behind victor Luca Paolini and runner-up Niki Terpstra.

After finishing 31 seconds down on Paris–Roubaix winner John Degenkolb, Bradley Wiggins retired from the team and joined his own  team, allowing him to focus on the 2016 Olympic Games.

New signing Wout Poels underwent surgery on a broken shoulder bone courtesy of his crash at La Fleche Wallonne.

Season victories

National, Continental and World champions 2015

Footnotes

References

External links
 

2015 in British sport
2015 road cycling season by team
Ineos Grenadiers